Pinedo is a village inside the boundaries of the Pobles del Sud district, in the municipality of Valencia. Its population consisted in 2,531 inhabitants in 2017.

Sources 

Towns in Spain